Marcelo dos Santos (born 17 May 1975), known as Marcelinho Paraíba or simply Marcelinho, is a Brazilian professional football coach and former player who played as an attacking midfielder.

In Brazil, he is also known as Marcelinho Paraíba, which refers to the state in which he was born, as a means to distinguish himself from other players also called "Marcelinho". He was one of the best playmakers in the Bundesliga because of his extravagant skills that include his visionary passing, abundance of tricks, and his world-class technique.

Career 
Born in Campina Grande, Paraíba, Marcelinho Paraíba began his career in Campinense, where he won two league titles there. Between 1994 and 1995, he played for Santos. Two years later, however, he made his breakthrough at São Paulo, where he won two Paulistões before being sold to Olympique de Marseille.

He only spent a year in France, and in 2001 he returned to Brazil to play for Grêmio, where he began to experience the pinnacle of his career. At that time, Marcelinho Paraiba was called "Marcelinho Paraúcho" by Gremistas, because of his passage in the team. He became champion and top scorer of the Campeonato Gaúcho, and champion of the Copa do Brasil, where he scored a goal in the second game in the final against Corinthians, but did not play in the league that year because before the tournament, he signed a five-year contract with Hertha BSC.

Marcelinho played for Hertha from 2001 to 2006. He is ranked among the most important players in the association's history and there Marcelinho was known as a technically talented player, serving as a playmaker and leader while performing in both the midfield and forward area. In addition, he carried the responsibility of executing the free kicks, corner kicks, and penalty kicks of the club. The personal trademarks of this extravagant football player are his usually remarkable shoes and his often multicolored hair. He was capped fives times for the Brazil national football team, for which he scored once. At the beginning of the 2006–07 season, he arbitrarily extended his off-season vacation by nine days, which led to some slight tension with the Hertha association management. After Marcelinho had expressed himself, in the following the days, contradictory statements as to whether he wanted to remain at Hertha or not, he ended his term with them, signing a three-year contract with Turkish club Trabzonspor for approximately 2.5 million euros.

In August 2008, Marcelinho Paraíba returned to Brazil to play for Flamengo. On 6 March 2009, Coritiba signed the forward on a free transfer until the end of the year, as Marcelinho terminated his contract with Flamengo. After the relegation of Coritiba, he re-signed for São Paulo on 18 December 2009. On 9 August 2010, he was loaned to Sport till the end of the 2010 season and his contract was extended to the end of the 2011 season.

Marcelinho subsequently represented Sport, Boa Esporte, Fortaleza, Internacional de Lages (two stints), Joinville, Oeste, Ypiranga de Erechim Treze and Portuguesa.

Retirement and return 
On 15 March 2020, he announced his retirement as a professional player, playing for Perilima against Centro Sportivo Paraibano in the eighth round of the 2020 Campeonato Paraibano; however, eight months later, he changed his mind and rejoined Treze in an effort to help them avoid relegation. He made his first appearance since returning from retirement on 28 November as a half-time substitute in a 1–1 draw with Vila Nova, being substituted himself in the 78th minute.

International goals

Managerial career 
On 10 December 2020, after Treze suffered relegation from the 2020 Campeonato Brasileiro Série C, Marcelinho was appointed manager of the club for the 2021 campaign. Despite a promising start in the 2021 Copa do Nordeste, he couldn't arrest a drop in performance which saw his side finish fourth in the first stage of the 2021 Campeonato Paraibano, and on 24 May 2021 he was dismissed. He joined Sport-PB as manager in September 2021. He was in role for only 15 days before resigning due to off-field problems. In late October 2021 he was announced as the coach of Oeirense for the 2022 season. He was sacked in February 2022, after six games of the season, following a heavy defeat. On 11 March 2022 he was announced as coach of Treze for a second time.

Honours

Club 
Campinense
Campeonato Paraibano: 1991, 1993

São Paulo
Campeonato Paulista: 1998, 2000

Grêmio
Campeonato Gaúcho: 2001
Copa do Brasil: 2001

Hertha BSC
DFB-Ligapokal: 2001, 2002

Boa Esporte
Taça Minas Gerais: 2012

Individual 
kicker Bundesliga Team of the Season: 2002–03, 2004–05

See also 
 List of men's footballers with the most official appearances

References

External links 
 
 
 
 

1975 births
Living people
Brazilian footballers
Brazilian expatriate footballers
Santos FC players
Rio Branco Esporte Clube players
São Paulo FC players
Olympique de Marseille players
Grêmio Foot-Ball Porto Alegrense players
Hertha BSC players
Trabzonspor footballers
Süper Lig players
VfL Wolfsburg players
CR Flamengo footballers
Coritiba Foot Ball Club players
Sport Club do Recife players
Grêmio Barueri Futebol players
Fortaleza Esporte Clube players
Esporte Clube Internacional de Lages players
Joinville Esporte Clube players
Oeste Futebol Clube players
Ypiranga Futebol Clube players
Treze Futebol Clube players
Associação Portuguesa de Desportos players
Expatriate footballers in France
Expatriate footballers in Germany
Brazilian expatriate sportspeople in Turkey
Expatriate footballers in Turkey
Brazil international footballers
Campeonato Brasileiro Série A players
Campeonato Brasileiro Série B players
Bundesliga players
Association football midfielders
Ligue 1 players
People from Campina Grande
Brazilian football managers
Treze Futebol Clube managers
Sportspeople from Paraíba